Popoudina pamphilia is a moth of the family Erebidae. It was described by Sergius G. Kiriakoff in 1958. It is found in Kenya, Rwanda and Uganda.

References

 

Erebid moths of Africa
Moths described in 1958